Dóra Győrffy (born 23 February 1978 in Budapest) is a Hungarian high jumper. She became Hungarian champion every year since 1996, except 2003, and NCAA champion for Harvard in 2001. Her personal best jump is 2.00 metres, achieved in July 2001 in Nyíregyháza. This is the Hungarian record.

Achievements

References

 Harvard University profile

1978 births
Living people
Hungarian female high jumpers
Athletes (track and field) at the 2000 Summer Olympics
Olympic athletes of Hungary
Harvard Crimson women's track and field athletes
Universiade medalists in athletics (track and field)
Athletes from Budapest
Universiade gold medalists for Hungary
Medalists at the 2003 Summer Universiade
Competitors at the 1997 Summer Universiade
Competitors at the 1999 Summer Universiade
Competitors at the 2001 Goodwill Games
20th-century Hungarian women
21st-century Hungarian women